Rupert Taylor (born 1958), is a Professor of Political Studies and former Head of the Department of Political Studies at the University of the Witwatersrand, Johannesburg, from 1987 to 2013.
He was educated at the progressive independent Dartington Hall School in England and completed a BA degree in Politics and Government at the University of Kent in 1980, followed by an MSc at the London School of Economics (1981) and a PhD in Sociology at Kent, (1986). He was formerly a Visiting Research Fellow in the Department of Political Science at the New School for Social Research in New York City, Adjunct Professor in the Department of Political Science at Columbia University and a Visiting Research Fellow in the School of Politics, Queen's University Belfast.

Publications include articles in African Affairs, Ethnic and Racial Studies, Peace and Change, The Political Quarterly, Race and Class, The Round Table, and Telos. He was editor of Politikon and Voluntas: International Journal of Voluntary and Nonprofit Organizations.

Rupert Taylor is a "B" rated National Research Foundation scholar.

Early career
As a Masters student at the London School of Economics Taylor achieved the highest distinction grade for the degree. His doctoral dissertation highlighted the problems confronting Queen's University Belfast in trying to maintain a liberal position in a deeply divided society and helped initiate the reform of sectarian employment practices in higher education in Northern Ireland. In 1984 his research findings were reported in the British and Irish media, and stimulated a Fair Employment Agency enquiry that resulted in new employment equity guidelines. Taylor's doctoral research was acknowledged in John Whyte's Interpreting Northern Ireland (Oxford University Press, 1990).

Consociationalism
Taylor's research interests include political violence, transitions to democracy and non-governmental organisations. He has written widely about South African politics and the Northern Ireland conflict. He has been critical of consociationalism as a strategy of conflict management.

Whilst at the New School for Research in New York (1993–94), Taylor developed a deeper critique of the way in which political science has dealt with race and ethnicity (expounded in the Ethnic and Racial Studies award-winning paper). This led him to propose a social transformation theory as a compelling way to bring about democratic peace in societies marked by racial and ethnic division – see his "Northern Ireland: Consociation or Social Transformation" chapter in John McGarry's Northern Ireland and the Divided World (Oxford University Press, 2001). Taylor's position on consociationalism is widely acknowledged in the political science literature on the Northern Ireland conflict and the South African transition from apartheid to democracy, a position consolidated with the recent publication of the edited volume on Consociational Theory (Routledge, 2009).

Taylor participated in a two-year international study of peace and conflict organisations in Northern Ireland, Israel/Palestine and South Africa. This study was conducted in collaboration with the International Society for Third Sector Research (ISTR), involved academics from Princeton University, Ben Gurion University, Tel Aviv University, University of Ulster and Bethlehem University, and was presented at the ISTR conference in Geneva in 1998.  This led to the publication of Gidron, Katz, and Hasenfeld (eds), Mobilizing for Peace (Oxford University Press, 2002). Taylor authored the chapter on South Africa. This book won the Virginia Hodgkinson Independent Sector research prize (2003).

South Africa
Taylor's peer-reviewed papers on the causes of political violence in South Africa have been referred to in many international publications. One such paper, published in African Affairs (2002), examines the structural nature of post-apartheid political violence in KwaZulu-Natal. Another is the earlier Race and Class paper (1991) on township political violence. In The Politics of Truth and Reconciliation in South Africa (Cambridge University Press, 2001), Wilson wrote that “Rupert Taylor came up with sophisticated theories of apartheid violence.” Taylor wrote a number of papers on non-racialism in South Africa, and along with Orkin wrote a substantial chapter on the racialisation of social scientific research on South Africa that attracted a scholarly response in the South African Sociological Review. Taylor has published two well-cited papers with Habib (Vice-Chancellor of Wits University) on opposition politics and the state of the South African nonprofit sector.

Editor of Voluntas
In 2000 Taylor was appointed editor of the ISTR journal Voluntas: International Journal of Voluntary and Nonprofit Organizations. As editor, he took the journal to Springer, a new major international publisher. As a result of Taylor's editorial direction the global academic visibility of Voluntas dramatically increased. It is now an ISA-rated journal and the leading journal focusing on the scholarly study of the third sector. Taylor served as editor until 2009 and compiled an edited volume on Third Sector Research (Springer, 2010).

Dismissal from Wits University
Taylor was placed on special leave by Wits University in 2013 following allegations of sexual harassment, which he disputed, and was subsequently dismissed from his position.

Selected publications
 "South Africa: Consociation or Democracy? ”. Telos 85 (Fall 1990). New York: Telos Press.
 "South Africa: Anti-Apartheid NGOs in Transition" with Adam Habib, Voluntas, 1999, Vol. 10, No. 1 https://link.springer.com/article/10.1023%2FA%3A1021495821397

References

External links
 Google Scholar profile
 academia.edu: Rupert Taylor papers

Living people
British political scientists
South African political scientists
1958 births
People educated at Dartington Hall School